The following list the city and town (municipal) halls in Metro Manila.

Current

Former

Proposed

References

 Metro Manila